iFilm2 (Persian: ,), also known as iFilm TV, is an Iranian entertainment network which consists of three channelsفارس  ارده, Arabic and Persian. The network was launched on September 9, 2010. The original purpose of the channel is to present Iranian films and series to the global audience. The network was managed by Mohammad Reza Hatami from its inauguration until he was replaced by Mehdi Mojtahed, son of Ayatollah Mojtahed Shabestari in June 2016.

In 2013, iFilmفارسی started an additional channel, broadcasting all content فارسی ارده.

Programs
The iFilm Network is a 24-hour TV channel, broadcasting an 8-hour block which is repeated twice, starting at 6:30PM Tehran Time. Programming includes TV series, movies, live quizzes on arts, backstage documentaries on films and ongoing productions, movie and film reviews, short films and documentaries about Iran. It usually shows series that already aired from various IRIB channels, but it has had a successful series production, Yadavari (Remembrance) (2013).

In 2015, iFilm was shortlisted by an international jury for a prestigious Eutelsat TV Award.

References

External links

IRIB IFilm Live streaming

Television channels and stations established in 2010
Arabic-language television stations
Television stations in Iran
Persian-language television stations
Islamic Republic of Iran Broadcasting
English-language television stations
Shia media